The 44th New Zealand Parliament was a term of the Parliament of New Zealand. Its composition was determined by the 1993 elections, and it sat until the 1996 elections.

The 44th Parliament was the last to be elected under the old FPP electoral system, with voters approving a change to MMP at the same time as they voted in the 1993 elections. As such, the 44th Parliament saw a considerable amount of positioning for the change — at the beginning of the term, there were four parties in Parliament, but at the end, there were seven parties and one independent. The National Party, which had begun the term with a majority, was forced by the end of the term to form a coalition with several smaller parties to remain in power. Despite the various maneuverings, however, the National Party remained in government for the duration of the 44th Parliament, which comprised National's second term in office. The other three parties present at the start of the 44th Parliament, being the Labour Party, the Alliance, and New Zealand First, all remained in opposition.

The 44th Parliament consisted of ninety-nine representatives, two more than the previous Parliament. All of these representatives were chosen by single-member geographical electorates, including four special Māori electorates.

Electoral boundaries for the 44th Parliament

Overview of seats
The table below shows the number of MPs in each party following the 1993 election and at dissolution:

Notes
The Working Government majority is calculated as all Government MPs less all other parties.
 The Green Party entered a confidence and supply agreement with the Labour-Alliance coalition

Initial composition of the 44th Parliament

Changes during 44th Parliament
There was one by-election held during the term of the 44th Parliament.

Summary of changes during term

Ruth Richardson, the National Party MP for Selwyn, quit Parliament in August 1994, having been replaced as Minister of Finance the previous year. Her departure prompted a by-election in Selwyn, which was won by David Carter of the National Party.
Peter Dunne, the Labour Party MP for Onslow, left his party in October 1994, believing that Labour was becoming increasingly left-wing. He was an independent for a time before founding the small Future New Zealand party. He would later join with United (see below).
Ross Meurant, the National Party MP for Hobson, left his party in September 1994, having clashed on a number of issues with the party's leadership. He eventually established the Right of Centre party.
Graeme Lee, the National Party MP for Matakana, left his party in 1994, partly due to policy disputes with its leadership and partly due to having lost his Cabinet post in a reshuffle. He founded a new party which eventually became the Christian Democrat Party.
Trevor Rogers, the National Party MP for Howick, left his party in June 1995, after disputes regarding policy issues with the party's leadership. He joined Ross Meurant's new party.
A group of centrist MPs from both the National Party and the Labour Party, along with Peter Dunne and his Future New Zealand party, established a centrist party named United New Zealand in June 1995. The MPs who founded United were Margaret Austin, Bruce Cliffe, Peter Dunne, Clive Matthewson, Pauline Gardiner, Peter Hilt, and John Robertson.
Ross Meurant, founder of Right of Centre, came into conflict with his own party (now renamed the Conservatives) in February 1996, and left the party to become an independent again. Trevor Rogers, the sole remaining MP, became leader.
Jack Elder, the Labour Party MP for Henderson, Peter McCardle, the National Party MP for Heretaunga, and Michael Laws, the National Party MP for Hawke's Bay, all left their parties to join New Zealand First in April 1996.
Michael Laws, the New Zealand First (originally National) MP for Hawkes Bay, resigned from Parliament after the so-called "Antoinette Beck" controversy. Rather than hold a by-election, the Prime Minister simply brought the 1996 general election forward slightly, as the rules allow that if a general election is approaching, a vacant seat need not be filled immediately.

Notes

References

New Zealand parliaments